Rajeev Topno; born 28 May 1974 in Ranchi, Jharkhand) is an Indian civil servant posted as Senior Advisor to the executive director of the World Bank Group, Rajesh Khullar. He is a member of Indian Administrative Service of Gujarat Cadre.  Previously, he was private secretary to the prime minister of India, Narendra Modi.

Education and early life
Rajeev Topno did his schooling from St. Thomas' Boys School, Khiderpore. He received Bachelor of Arts degree in political science and sociology from St. Xavier's College, Kolkata and joined Gujarat cadre in 1998 as assistant collector at Bharuch. He served state government in different capacities at district and state level till 2009. Thenafter, he was on central government deputation  posted as the deputy secretary at Prime Minister's office, Delhi from 2009 to 2014. And on 19 July 2014 he was appointed as the private secretary of the prime minister of India, Narendra Modi.

References 

Munda people
Prime Minister's Office (India)
1974 births
Living people
Indian Christians
Indian Administrative Service officers